10 is a scripted miniseries about a poker game. The series aired on TSR1 between 21 November and 19 December 2010.

Awards

References

External links
 10 at the Internet Movie Database

2010s television miniseries
Swiss television series
2010s Swedish television series
2010 Swiss television series debuts
2010 Swiss television series endings
Swiss television miniseries
Radio Télévision Suisse original programming